Chaser, The Chaser or Chasers may refer to:

Animals
 Chaser (dog) (2004–2019), an American Border Collie dog
 Chaser, a horse trained for steeple-chasing
 Chaser, a type of dragonfly

Entertainment
 "Chaser" (song), a 2016 song by Carrie Underwood
 "Chaser", a song by The Wonder Years from The Greatest Generation
 The Chaser, an Australian satirical comedy group
 The Chaser (1938 film), a US film
 The Chaser (2008 film), a South Korean action-thriller about a serial killer 
 Chasers, a 1994 comedy film
 The Chaser (TV series), a 2012 South Korean television series about a grieving father seeking revenge against corrupt officials 
 "The Chaser" (The Twilight Zone)
 The Chasers, residential quiz experts on The Chase, a game show originally from the UK
 Chaser (video game), a 2003 sci-fi first person shooter video game
 The Chaser, the proxy form of Kate in the video game Slender: The Arrival
 Chaser, a character of One Piece comic books
 Chaser (album), a 1985 album by Terje Rypdal, with Bjørn Kjellemyr and Audun Kleive
 Chasers, a 2010 novel by Mark Michalowski

Technology
 Chaser or Chase gun, a cannon mounted in the bow or stern of a sailing ship
 HMS Chaser (D32), an aircraft carrier
 Toyota Chaser, an automobile
 Cosmik Chaser, a British ultralight trike design

Other uses
 Chaser (bartending), a drink taken after a shot of hard liquor
 The Chaser (newspaper), Australian satirical newspaper (1999–2005)
 Chaser, a person who carries out the metalwork craft of repoussé and chasing
 Chaser is also a slang term for a person who fetishizes transgender people

See also
 Submarine chaser
 Chase (disambiguation)
 Pahonia (disambiguation)